Ice mile is a swimming term.

Rules 

The International Ice Swimming Association defines rules for swimming in these conditions.

Records 

The International Ice Swimming Association maintains records.

References

Swimming